is a football stadium in Hamamatsu, Shizuoka, Japan.

External links
Shizuoka Prefecture home page

Buildings and structures in Hamamatsu
Football venues in Japan
Sports venues in Shizuoka Prefecture